Cantando is an album by Swedish pianist Bobo Stenson recorded in 2007 and released on the ECM label.

Reception
The Allmusic review by Thom Jurek awarded the album 4 stars stating "This is a stellar effort that announces -- hopefully -- an extended run for this trio".

Track listing

 "Olivia" (Silvio Rodríguez) - 6:38 
 "Song of Ruth" (Petr Eben) - 6:42
 "Wooden Church" (Jormin) - 7:01 
 "M" (Jormin) - 7:59 
 "Chiquilín de Bachín" (Horacio Ferrer, Astor Piazzolla) - 8:04 
 "Pages" (Jon Fält, Anders Jormin, Bobo Stenson) - 13:40 
 "Don's Kora Song" (Don Cherry) - 5:08
 "A Fixed Goal" (Ornette Coleman) - 4:12 
 "Love, I've Found You" (Connie Moore, Danny Small) - 3:12 
 "Liebesode" (Alban Berg) 8:36 
 "Song of Ruth, var." (Eben) - 6:47

Personnel
Bobo Stenson — piano
Anders Jormin — bass
Jon Fält — drums

References

ECM Records albums
Bobo Stenson albums
2008 albums
Albums produced by Manfred Eicher